Ángel Miguel Rondón (born December 1, 1997) is a Dominican professional baseball pitcher who is a free agent. He has previously played in Major League Baseball (MLB) for the St. Louis Cardinals.

Professional career

St. Louis Cardinals
Rondón signed with the St. Louis Cardinals as an international free agent on January 6, 2016. He made his professional debut that year with the Rookie-level Dominican Summer League Cardinals, going 2–2 with a 2.79 ERA over 42 innings. 

In 2017, he played with the Dominican League Cardinals, the Rookie-level Gulf Coast League Cardinals, and the Johnson City Cardinals of the Rookie-level Appalachian League, going a combined 3–4 with a 3.14 ERA over 14 games (11 starts) between the three clubs. He spent 2018 with the State College Spikes of the Class A Short Season New York–Penn League and the Peoria Chiefs of the Class A Midwest League, posting a 3–6 record and a 3.17 ERA over 15 starts with both teams, striking out 80 batters over 88 innings. He played in 2019 with the Palm Beach Cardinals of the Class A-Advanced Florida State League (where he was named an All-Star) and the Springfield Cardinals of the Class AA Texas League, pitching to an 11–7 record, a 2.93 ERA, and 159 strikeouts over 160 innings and 28 starts with both clubs. Following the season, the Cardinals named Rondón their Minor League Pitcher of the Year.

Rondón did not play a minor league game in 2020 due to the cancellation of the minor league season caused by the COVID-19 pandemic. After the 2020 season, the Cardinals added him to their 40-man roster. To begin the 2021 season, he was assigned to the Memphis Redbirds of the Triple-A East League. On June 5, 2021, Rondón was promoted to the major leagues for the first time. He made his MLB debut the next day, pitching a scoreless inning of relief against the Cincinnati Reds. In the game, he also recorded his first major league strikeout, against Jonathan India. On July 8, 2022, the Cardinals designated him for assignment.

San Francisco Giants
On July 13, 2022, the San Francisco Giants acquired him off waivers from the Cardinals. He was designated for assignment on July 26. He was released on August 10, 2022.

References

External links

Living people
1997 births
Major League Baseball players from the Dominican Republic
Major League Baseball pitchers
St. Louis Cardinals players
Dominican Summer League Cardinals players
Gulf Coast Cardinals players
Johnson City Cardinals players
State College Spikes players
Peoria Chiefs players
Palm Beach Cardinals players
Springfield Cardinals players
Memphis Redbirds players
Águilas Cibaeñas players